Rudo is a town and municipality located in Republika Srpska, an entity of Bosnia and Herzegovina. As of 2013, it has a population of 7,963 inhabitants, while the town of Rudo has a population of 1,949 inhabitants.

It is famous throughout former Yugoslav republics as the birthplace of the 1st Proletarian Brigade formed by Yugoslav Partisans.

History
The town of Rudo was established in 1555 by Sokollu Mustafa Pasha, a close relative of Ottoman Vizier Sokollu Mehmed Pasha. A stone mosque, bridge over the Lim, hamam, inn, mekteb (school), tekke, some shops and houses were built. It was mentioned by Evliya Çelebi (1611–1682). It was flooded in 1896, and then expanded into an urban settlement. Following the collapse of the Republic of Užice and the time spent in the village of Drenova leader of Yugoslav Partisans arrived to Rudo on 21 December 1941. The 1st Proletarian Brigade of the Yugoslav Partisans was established in Rudo on 22 December 1941. A monument dedicated to the Brigade was erected in 1961, with a museum subsequently being opened a decade later.

Settlements

 Arbanasi
 Arsići
 Bare
 Bijelo Brdo
 Biševići
 Bjelugovina
 Bjelušine
 Bjeljevine
 Blizna
 Boranovići
 Bovan
 Božovići
 Budalice
 Cvrkote
 Čavdari
 Danilovići
 Dolovi
 Donja Rijeka
 Donja Strmica
 Donje Cikote
 Donji Ravanci
 Dorići
 Dubac
 Dugovječ
 Džihanići
 Gaočići
 Gojava
 Gornja Rijeka
 Gornja Strmica
 Gornje Cikote
 Gornji Ravanci
 Grabovik
 Grivin
 Janjići
 Knjeginja
 Kosovići
 Kovači
 Kula
 Ljutava
 Međurečje
 Mikavice
 Mioče
 Misajlovina
 Mokronozi
 Mrsovo
 Nikolići
 Obrvena
 Omačina
 Omarine
 Oputnica
 Orah
 Oskoruša
 Past
 Pazalje
 Peljevići
 Petačine
 Plema
 Pohare
 Polimlje
 Popov Do
 Prebidoli
 Pribišići
 Prijevorac
 Radoželje
 Rakovići
 Ravne Njive
 Resići
 Rudo
 Rupavci
 Setihovo
 Sokolovići
 Stankovača
 Staro Rudo
 Strgači
 Strgačina
 Šahdani
 Štrpci
 Trbosilje
 Trnavci
 Trnavci kod Rudog
 Ustibar
 Uvac
 Vagan
 Viti Grab
 Zagrađe
 Zarbovina
 Zlatari
 Zubač
 Zubanj

Demographics

Population

Ethnic composition

Trivia
It appears in Ivo Andrić's story "The Beys of Rudo."

Notable people
Sokollu Mehmed Pasha, Ottoman Grand Vizier of Rumelia
Stevan Moljević, politician

See also
 Municipalities of Republika Srpska

References

External links

Populated places in Rudo
Cities and towns in Republika Srpska
Rudo